Caroline Semaille is a French epidemiologist and infectious disease specialist. In February 2023, she was appointed director of the French National Public Health Agency.

Life 
In 2000, she joined the Institut de veille sanitaire, as an epidemiologist, for the EuroHIV program. In 2002, she took over the management of the HIV/AIDS, STIs and Hepatitis Unit.

From 2013 to 2019, she was a member of the High Council for Public Health (HCSP), and also participated in the National Commission for Ethics and Public Health and Environmental Alerts.

From May 2019 to April 2021, she was Deputy Director General in charge of the Regulated Products Division at ANSES. In April 2021, she was appointed Deputy Managing Director in charge of operations. She holds an accreditation to direct research in life sciences and health.

In February 2023, she was appointed director of the National Public Health Agency.

References 

Living people
French epidemiologists
Women epidemiologists
21st-century French scientists
21st-century French women scientists
Year of birth missing (living people)
French health officials
People in public health
1967 births
French women physicians